The Finlandia Trophy is an annual senior-level international figure skating competition held in Finland. It was held in Helsinki. Skaters competed in the disciplines of men's singles, ladies' singles, and ice dancing.

Results

Men

Ladies

Ice dancing

External links
 2000 Finlandia Trophy results

Finlandia Trophy
Finlandia Trophy, 2000
Finlandia Trophy, 2000